Metronome is a large public art installation located along the south end of Union Square in New York City.  The work was commissioned by the Related Companies, developers of One Union Square South, with the participation of the Public Art Fund and the Municipal Art Society. The $4.2 million provided by the developer makes it one of the largest private commissions of public art.

The artwork was created by Kristin Jones and Andrew Ginzel and consists of several sections, including a round circular void from which puffs of white steam were at one point released throughout the day, and a clock made of large orange LED digits. Installation of Metronome began in February 1999, and its dedication took place on October 26, 1999.



The clock 

On the left side of the work is a set of fifteen large LED digits, called "The Passage", which display the time in 24-hour format. The seven leftmost digits show the time in conventional 24-hour format, as hours (2 digits), minutes (2 digits), seconds (2 digits), tenths of a second (1 digit).  The seven rightmost digits display the amount of time remaining in a 24-hour day, as tenths of a second (1 digit), seconds (2 digits), minutes (2 digits), hours (2 digits).  The center digit represents hundredths of a second. For instance, if the clock reads "195641189810304", it means that time is 19:56 (7:56 PM) and 41.1 seconds, and that there are 04 hours, 03 minutes, and 18.9 seconds remaining in the day.

For a few months in 2005, the clock on Metronome did not give the time of day, but instead counted down the time until the International Olympic Committee was to announce the host city of the 2012 Summer Olympics. New York City ultimately lost its bid to be host city to the 2012 Olympics to London. 

The clock showed the wrong figures for over a year in 2010–2011 until, in June 2011, the dial-up connection it had previously used to obtain an atomic time reading was updated.

On September 19, 2020, Metronome became a climate clock as it started showing the time remaining until the Earth's carbon budget is used up as a result of concerns related to global warming above the 1.5°C threshold that was outlined in the Paris Agreement. The fifteen digits counted down the years (1 digit), days (3 digits), hours (2 digits), minutes (2 digits), and seconds (2 digits) from left to right, in conventional 24-hour format with spaces to the left of each digit. The modified display was devised by artists Andrew Boyd and Gan Golan.

Artists' statement 
Artists Kristin Jones and Andrew Ginzel state that:

Reception 

Metronome and One Union Square, the building to which it is attached, have not been well received by critics or the public.  Kristin Jones, co-creator of the work, complains that it is "the most unloved piece of public art in the city".  Among Metronome's critics are New York Times architecture critic Herbert Muschamp, who described it as "Pretentious ... the artists' basic miscalculation was to assume that a large surface called for comparably big forms ... It's just some space in a box with a leaky hole in it."  The New York Post put One Union Square at #2 on its "10 Buildings We Love to Hate" list, calling it "a grotesque modern nightmare."  James Gaynor of the New York Observer wrote of Metronome, "Fail so big that no one can do anything about it ... New York now has its very own Wailing Wall, a site (and sight) of cultural pilgrimage where the death of aesthetics can be contemplated."

In various letters to the editor, the public has written of Metronome: "Well-intentioned, but ultimately flat, corporate art. It is a confounding installation based on a contrived theme ('the impossibility of knowing Time')"; "[a] gigantic waste of time, space, and money [that] seems like a satire on all public monuments"; and "a colossal waste of a facade".  However, one respondent felt that Metronome was "a large and very elegant digital hourglass; time 'pours' from the numbers on the right to the left ... The other elements are likewise very thoughtful and sophisticated ruminations on time, its passage and the ways in which we mark it."

See also 
 Debt clock
 Doomsday Clock

References

Further reading 

Morgan, Robert C. "Metronome." Sculpture. May 2000. pp. 10–12; ill.
Muschamp, Herbert. "The Ominous Message of a Box on Union Square." The New York Times. January 2, 2000. pp. 43, 48; ill.
LeBon, Ian. "Under Metronome." Metropolis. January 2000. pp. 36, 48; ill.
Newhall, Edith. "Happening Time and Again." New York Magazine. October 25, 1999. p. 110; ill.
Kastner, Jeffrey. "A Giant Timepiece That's also a Piece about Time." The New York Times. September 19, 1999. pp. 38, 39; ill.
Copage, Eric V. "Giant Artwork to Announce Time in Infinite Detail." The New York Times. June 13, 1999. ill.
Wines, Suzan. "Oculus & Metronome: two installations for New York City." Domus. April 1999. p. 34; ill.
Public Art Fund. "New York Minute (Top 100 Treasures)." Art & Antiques. March 1998. p. 74; ill.
Clark, Jim. "Passing Time in Union Square." NYArts Magazine. June 1997. p. 52; ill.
Keenan, Georgina. "Letting Off Steam." ARTnews. May 1997. p. 36; ill.
Lazzati, Cristina. "Ventun piani di frivolezza." L'Espresso. April 24, 1997. p. 147; ill.
Eccles, Tom. "A timepiece for the millennium and beyond." Inprocess. Spring 1997. p. 2; ill.
Vogel, Carol. "An 'Artwall' at Union Square." The New York Times. March 7, 1997. p. C34; ill.

External links 

Artists' pages dedicated to the work
Developer's site dedicated to the work
Google Answer's page with  helpful information and links

Installation art works
Public art in New York City
1999 sculptures
Kinetic art
14th Street (Manhattan)
Union Square, Manhattan